Choi Gyeong-hui (born 13 September 1981) is a South Korean long-distance runner. She competed in the women's marathon at the 2004 Summer Olympics.

References

1981 births
Living people
Athletes (track and field) at the 2004 Summer Olympics
South Korean female long-distance runners
South Korean female marathon runners
Olympic athletes of South Korea
Place of birth missing (living people)
Athletes (track and field) at the 2002 Asian Games
Athletes (track and field) at the 2006 Asian Games
Asian Games competitors for South Korea
21st-century South Korean women